Mannargudi division is a revenue division in the Tiruvarur district of Tamil Nadu, India. It comprises the taluks of Mannargudi, Needamangalam and Thiruthiraipoondi.

Tiruvarur district